The Persistent Lovers  is a 1922 British silent drama film directed by Guy Newall and starring Newall, Ivy Duke and A. Bromley Davenport. It was an adaptation of a 1915 novel by A. Hamilton Gibbs.

Plot summary

Cast
 Guy Newall - Richard Ardley-Manners
 Ivy Duke - Lady Audrey Beaumont
 A. Bromley Davenport - Duke of Harborough
 Julian Royce - Anthony Waring
 Lawford Davidson - Honorable Ivor Jocelyn
 Barbara Everest - Joyce
 Douglas Munro - John
 Ernest A. Douglas - Reverend Ardley-Manners
 Emilie Nichol - Duchess

References

Bibliography
 Low, Rachael. History of the British Film, 1918-1929. George Allen & Unwin, 1971.

External links
 
 

1922 films
Films based on British novels
Films directed by Guy Newall
1922 drama films
British silent feature films
British black-and-white films
Films set in England
British drama films
1920s English-language films
1920s British films
Silent drama films